Fine Fettle Yorkshire (formerly Yorkshire Feta) is a British cheese made from the milk of sheep produced in North Yorkshire by Shepherds Purse Cheeses. The owner, Judy Bell, was forced to change the cheese's name after an EU ruling meant that all feta cheese must be produced in Greece; its country of origin.

References

External links
 Shepherds Purse Cheeses website

English cheeses
Sheep's-milk cheeses
North Yorkshire
Yorkshire cuisine